Julie Cox is an English actress. She played Princess Irulan in the Sci Fi Channel's 2000 miniseries Frank Herbert's Dune and its 2003 sequel, Frank Herbert's Children of Dune. She also played The Childlike Empress in The Neverending Story III.

Career
One of Cox's earliest roles was the Childlike Empress in the 1994 film The NeverEnding Story III. She played Diana, Princess of Wales in Princess in Love by David Greene, a film released in 1996 based upon the publication by Anna Pasternak. Cox played the character Sophie Aronnax in a remake of 20,000 Leagues under the Sea in 1997, and in 1999 she appeared as Giulietta in the film adaptation of Alegría.

Cox portrayed Princess Irulan in the 2000 Sci Fi Channel miniseries Frank Herbert's Dune and its 2003 sequel, Frank Herbert's Children of Dune.

Cox starred with Jean-Claude Van Damme in Second in Command (2006) and in 2007 was the female lead in The Riddle alongside Vinnie Jones, Derek Jacobi, and Vanessa Redgrave. She starred in The Oxford Murders with Elijah Wood and John Hurt in 2008.

Cox portrayed a fictionalised Mary Shelley, a companion of the Eighth Doctor, in several Big Finish Productions Doctor Who audio dramas, including The Company of Friends, The Silver Turk, The Witch from the Well and Army of Death.

Personal life
Cox lives in Bristol, with her partner and has a son named Luke.

Filmography

Film

Television

References

External links

1973 births
Living people
English film actresses
English television actresses
English people of Irish descent
English people of Scottish descent
People from Ely, Cambridgeshire
Actresses from Cambridgeshire
20th-century English actresses
21st-century English actresses